iSyllabus  is a five-year Islamic studies course developed and piloted at the University of Glasgow. The course first began in 2008 and has now taught over 7000 students across 15 cities. The course aims to give an introduction to the 'Islamic sciences as they relate to both the individual and society in the 21st Century,' - a key differentiator between it and other courses and 'Madrasa' curriculum which can be found throughout the United Kingdom.

Vision 
The course aims to "develop the next generation of active citizens and faith-inspired thought leaders in the West through transformative Islamic education programmes".

Course differentiators 
The course claims to deliver on five areas which differentiate it from other Islamic studies curricula:

 "Relevance - Identifying the most relevant topics of religious discourse in the West
 Function - Acknowledging the changing dynamics of religious leadership in the Modern world
 Synthesis - Incorporating elements from successful Islamic studies syllabi of the Muslim world
 Language - Nurturing the English language as a Muslim language of instruction
 Competency - Developing religious literacy and competency in the Islamic sciences"

Course structure 
The course is divided into three levels:

 'Diploma' (1 year)
 'Intermediate' (2 years)
 'Advanced' (2 years)

Diploma course 
The diploma course covers the following 15 modules:

 The Laws of Purity & Prayer
 Seeking purity
 Setting the base for worship
 Perfecting the Prayer
 Returning to the Homeland
 Towards a Tranquil Soul 
 Towards a Tranquil Soul 1
 Towards a Tranquil Soul 2
 Understanding the Divine Sources
 Understanding the Qu'ran
 Understanding the Sunnah
 Living the Law
 Living the Law 1 - Theory
 Living the Law 2 - Case Studies
 Articulating Muslim Creed
 Understanding Muslim Creed 1
 Understanding Muslim Creed 2
 Family & Society
 Understanding the Law and Spirituality of Income and Charity
 The Sacred Bond
 Orthodoxy & Orthopraxy
 The Tradition of Scholars

NB: There is also iSyllabus for Schools which offers a set of 5 workbooks for GCSE students and have been designed with current day needs and understandings.

Awards

References 

Islamic studies